WAME (550 AM) is a radio station broadcasting a classic country format. Licensed to Statesville, North Carolina, United States.  The station is owned by Statesville Family Radio Corporation. WAME's programming can also be heard on FM at 92.9 MHz over translator W225BD, which operates at 19 watts.

The programming is currently a mix of locally produced programming and Dial Global's Classic Hit Country format.

History

Duke Family
The station on 550 AM in Statesville, North Carolina began in 1955 as WDBM, and operated only during daytime hours with licensed power of 500 watts.  WDBM was founded by Walter A. Duke. In 1967, the Duke family started WDBM-FM at 96.9 FM, now known as WKKT, which initially was simulcast with WDBM. WDBM-FM continued to broadcast easy-listening music in the evenings after WDBM signed off.

Ferguson Family
In 1973, the Duke family sold the both stations to the Ferguson Family.  The new owners separated the operations of the AM and FM, and the AM began broadcasting a country music format.  The FM was given the calls WOOO and on-air was called "Triple-O 97".

Metrolina Communications
In 1980, both WDBM and WOOO were sold to Metrolina Communications of Orlando, Florida.  WDBM became WDRV and switched to an adult contemporary format.

GHB Broadcasting
WDRV was sold to Statesville Family Communications, a subsidiary of GHB Broadcasting.  The format was changed to Southern gospel music and religious teaching.

In 1990, the call letters became WAME and in 1994 they became WHYM.

In 1996, the station became WIST - "Station of the Stars" - an affiliate of the Music of Your Life adult standards network.

In 1997, GHB Broadcasting created a regional talk network called Total Radio to compete in the Charlotte, NC market against heritage station WBT.  As part that effort, the call letters changed to WTLI when it joined the Total Radio simulcast. The attempt to compete against 50,000-watt WBT was not successful.

By 1998 the WIST call letters were back to Statesville, with the Real Country format on the station, and the station became WAME again in October 2000.

In the early 2000s, long-time radio personality J. D. Benfield began doing the morning show on the station, and the remainder of the day's programming was the Stardust satellite format from ABC Radio Networks.

In February 2008, WAME became "Country Legends 550." Benfield left the station in August 2008.

On October 1, 2008, country radio personality John Glenn joined WAME as  Operations Manager and Morning Show Host.  "Big Country Mornings with John Glenn" began airing on Monday, January 12, 2009.

References

External links

AME
Classic country radio stations in the United States
Iredell County, North Carolina